Yiğit İsmail Gökoğlan (born 5 June 1989) is a Turkish professional footballer who plays as a winger for Bergama Belediyespor.

Gökoğlan is also a youth international, having been capped at U-19, U-20, and U-21 levels for Turkey.

Early years 
Gökoğlan was born in Konak, İzmir. His parents divorced at an early age and he lived with his father, seeing his mother on weekends. Originally a forward, Gökoğlan switched to the winger position after moving to Manisaspor. In 1999, Gökoğlan joined local club Aliağa. At the time, his school and the club's training grounds were near his home, allowing easy access to both. However, once his father decided to move to Turgutlu, a large town in Manisa Province, Gökoğlan was left to live at the training facilities as a 14-year-old.

Club career

Manisaspor 
Levent Eriş, along with his assistant Hakan Şapçı, discovered Gökoğlan at a youth league match. They signed him to a youth contract with Manisaspor in 2006. As a 16-year-old, Gökoğlan would train with the senior squad, while still competing in the youth leagues. In total, he made 44 appearances in the A2 league, scoring four goals. At the start of the 2007–08 season, Giray BULAK  took over as manager. Gökoğlan was loaned out to TFF Third League outfit Altınordu during the winter break. He was unable to settle in at first, but began to feel better once the club started winning matches. At the end of the season, Altınordu missed out on direct promotion because of the goal difference rule. However, the team won promotion after defeating Bingöl Belediyespor and Keçiörengücü in the promotion play-offs. Gökoğlan made 14 appearances, scoring one goal.

Galatasaray 

After months of speculation on his future, on 12 January 2012 it was announced that Yiğit joined Galatasaray on a 4 and a half year deal for a fee of €2.5 million.

On 25 January 2012 he scored his first league goal for Galatasaray against MKE Ankaragücü on his debut in a 4-0 home win.

International career 
Gökoğlan was first called up to national duty in 2008, after a third round matchup against Aydınspor. He competed in six friendlies, before playing all three matches during 2008 UEFA European Under-19 Football Championship elite qualification. Turkey finished third and did not progress. Gökoğlan was then called up to the U-20s, playing two friendlies against Finland. He has also been capped at U-21 level, playing in the Akdeniz Cup and 2011 UEFA European Under-21 Football Championship qualification.

Honours 
Galatasaray
Süper Lig (1): 2011–12
Süper Kupa (1): 2012

References

External links 

 
 
 
 

1989 births
People from Konak
Footballers from İzmir
Living people
Turkish footballers
Turkey youth international footballers
Turkey under-21 international footballers
Turkey B international footballers
Association football wingers
Göztepe S.K. footballers
Manisaspor footballers
Altınordu F.K. players
Galatasaray S.K. footballers
Orduspor footballers
Kayseri Erciyesspor footballers
Akhisarspor footballers
Balıkesirspor footballers
Bandırmaspor footballers
Fethiyespor footballers
Zonguldakspor footballers
Süper Lig players
TFF First League players
TFF Second League players
TFF Third League players